DSD may refer to:

Medical and Research
 Detrusor sphincter dyssynergia, disorder of urination
 Disorders of sex development, differences of sex differentiation
 Definitive Screening Design, an experimental design for multiple variables

Technology
 Data structure diagram of a data model
 Direct Stream Digital, Sony and Philips digital recording trademark
 Document Structure Description, a schema language for describing valid XML

Organizations
 Defence Signals Directorate, an Australian intelligence agency
 Department for Social Development
 Drainage Services Department, Hong Kong
 Davis School District, Utah
 Delaware School for the Deaf

Government
 United States District Court for the District of South Dakota, abbreviation in case decisions
 Downing Street Declaration, by UK PM and Irish Taoiseach
 New Zealand Distinguished Service Decoration, a medal awarded by the New Zealand Defence Force

Media
 Do Something Different, a British CBBC television show
 DSD, a group on the album Thug Misses

Other uses
 Defence Studies Department (King's College, London)
 Deutsches Sprachdiplom (German Language Diploma), of the German Academic Exchange Service
 Direct store delivery, without 3rd party distributor
 Discover Scuba Diving program
 Driver's Safety Device, or dead man's switch
 Raindrop size distribution in rain, snow, etc...